BeiGene is a biotechnology company that specializes in the development of drugs for cancer treatment. Founded in Beijing in 2010 by Xiaodong Wang and chief executive officer John V. Oyler, the company has offices in China, the United States, Australia and Europe. BeiGene has developed several pharmaceuticals, including tislelizumab, a checkpoint inhibitor, and zanubrutinib, a Bruton's tyrosine kinase inhibitor that became the first cancer drug developed in China to gain the U.S. Food and Drug Administration's approval when it received accelerated approval to treat mantle cell lymphoma in November 2019.

History 
BeiGene was founded in late 2010 by Xiaodong Wang, a Chinese-American scientist, and John V. Oyler, an American entrepreneur who serves as the company's chief executive officer and chairman. While many pharmaceutical drugs are manufactured in China, almost all early research and development for the drugs takes place elsewhere. Wang and Oyler envisioned a biopharmaceutical company with strong ties to China to conduct research and development. They chose to focus specifically on cancer treatment.

By July 2011, they had recruited more than 60 Chinese scientists, including 20 who were U.S.-educated. In the U.S., BeiGene has offices in California, Massachusetts, and New Jersey. It has also established research locations in Australia and Europe.

On February 2, 2016, BeiGene had its first initial public offering (IPO) of 6.6 million shares priced at $24 on the Nasdaq Stock Market under the ticker symbol BGNE. The company raised $182 million, which it planned to use for further research. The IPO, managed by Goldman Sachs and Morgan Stanley, was backed by Hillhouse BGN Holdings and Baker Brothers, which together planned to purchase half the shares offered. In a March 2018 follow-on offering, Beigene raised another $758 million. In August 2018, the company had another IPO when it offered a secondary listing of its shares on the Hong Kong Stock Exchange, raising $903 million in the process.

In July 2017, BeiGene entered into a partnership with Celgene to continue the development and commercialization of the cancer drug BGB-A317, also known as tislelizumab. BeiGene also acquired Celgene's operations in China as well as the rights to commercialize Abraxane, Revlimid and Vidaza, Celgene's approved drugs in China. As part of the deal, Celgene made a $150 million equity investment in BeiGene and acquired the rights for the sale of tislelizumab overseas for $263 million, with another $980 million plus royalties contingent on future sales. The deal stipulated that, if Celgene began work on a competitor drug, BeiGene could buy back the rights to tislelizumab. In January 2019, Celgene was acquired by Bristol-Myers Squibb, which is developing a similar cancer immunotherapy drug, Opdivo, allowing BeiGene to regain its overseas rights to tislelizumab. Celgene returned the rights to the drug in June 2019 along with a payment of $150 million to conclude the deal.

In late 2019, Amgen Inc. acquired 20.5% of BeiGene in a deal valued at $2.7 billion, and gained a seat on BeiGene's board of directors. In turn, BeiGene acquired the rights to commercialize three Amgen pharmaceuticals, Xgeva, Kyprolis, and Blincyto, as well as 20 others in development, investing $1.25 billion toward their research.

In January 2021, BeiGene announced a collaboration and license agreement with Novartis to develop and commercialize tislelizumab in Canada, member countries of the European Union, Switzerland, Iceland, Japan, Liechtenstein, Mexico, Norway, Russia, United Kingdom, and the U.S. In May 2021, BeiGene and Asieris Pharmaceuticals worked together to assess the efficacy and quality of Asieris's MetAP2 inhibitor and BeiGene's PD-L1 inhibitor for bladder cancer patients.

Research and development 
In addition to clinical research, BeiGene's early business model involved obtaining the rights to experimental medicines shelved by other pharmaceutical companies and taking them through early clinical trials at Chinese medical schools and hospitals. Successful formulas would either be sold to or co-developed with larger drugmakers who could fund the late-stage trials.

As the company grew, it began to expand its research and development in both directions, venturing into early drug formulation as well as late-stage clinical trials. One of BeiGene's late-stage therapies is tislelizumab (BGB-A317), a PD-1 antibody or PD-L1 inhibitor that prevents cancer tumors from evading the immune system. Tislelizumab is being developed as a monotherapy and in combination with other therapies for several types of cancer. In December 2019, it was approved by National Medical Products Administration in China for the treatment of Hodgkin lymphoma. In April 2020, tislelizumab was also approved in China to treat urothelial carcinoma. In September 2021, the U.S. Food and Drug Administration (FDA) accepted a biologics license application for tislelizumab to treat unresectable, recurrent locally advanced or metastatic esophageal squamous cell carcinoma that has previously been treated with systemic therapy.

BeiGene also developed zanubrutinib, a Bruton's tyrosine kinase inhibitor for the treatment of cancer, from a formula its scientists created in Beijing in 2012. In November 2019, zanubrutinib became the first cancer drug developed in China to gain FDA approval; it received accelerated approval for the treatment of mantle cell lymphoma (MCL), a rare and aggressive form of non-Hodgkin lymphoma. In June 2020, the drug was also approved in China for the treatment of MCL, chronic lymphocytic leukemia, and small lymphocytic lymphoma. BeiGene is also testing zanubrutinib as a treatment for COVID-19. In September 2021, the FDA approved zanubrutinib to treat adults with Waldenström's macroglobulinemia, a rare non-Hodgkin lymphoma, and separately granted an accelerated approval for use of the drug in the treatment of relapsed or refractory marginal zone B-cell lymphoma in patients who have been treated with an anti-CD20 regimen.

References

External links 

Biopharmaceutical companies
Chinese companies established in 2010
Companies based in Beijing
Pharmaceutical companies established in 2010
Pharmaceutical companies of China
Pharmaceutical companies of the United States